There are at least 27 named lakes and reservoirs in Chouteau County, Montana.

Lakes
 Antelope Lake, el. 
 Big Lake, el. 
 Big Sag Lake, el. 
 Clear Lake, el. 
 Floweree Lake, el. 
 Harwood Lake, el. 
 Kingsbury Lake, el. 
 Lonesome Lake, el. 
 Lost Lake, el. 
 Rocky Lake, el. 
 Sand Lake, el. 
 Shonkin Lake, el. 
 White Lake, el.

Reservoirs
 Birkeland Reservoir, el. 
 Boneau Reservoir, el. 
 Bonneau Reservoir, el. 
 Cowan Reservoir, el. 
 Cowan Reservoir, el. 
 Dammel Reservoir, el. 
 Dry Fork Reservoir, el. 
 Eightmile Springs, el. 
 Flick Lake, el. 
 Panton Coulee Reservoir, el. 
 Pirate Lake, el. 
 Rice Reservoir, el. 
 Seifort Reservoir, el. 
 White Elephant Reservoir, el.

See also
 List of lakes in Montana

Notes

Bodies of water of Chouteau County, Montana
Chouteau